Mantura is a genus of flea beetles in the family Chrysomelidae. There are about 20 described species, from the Nearctic, Palaearctic, and Oriental regions.

Selected species
 Mantura chrysanthemi (Koch, 1803)
 Mantura cylindrica Miller, 1880
 Mantura floridana Crotch, 1873
 Mantura fulvipes Jacoby, 1885
 Mantura horioni Heikertinger, 1940
 Mantura lutea (Allard, 1859)
 Mantura mathewsii (Curtis, 1833)
 Mantura obtusata (Gyllenhal, 1813)
 Mantura pallidicornis (Waltl, 1839)
 Mantura rustica (Linnaeus, 1767)

References

Further reading

External links

 

Alticini
Chrysomelidae genera
Articles created by Qbugbot
Taxa named by James Francis Stephens